Festejo (from Spanish 'fiesta') is a festive form of Afro-Peruvian music. The dance is a staple in the Black coastal populations and it celebrates the emancipation of slaves. Festejo is recognized for its high energy and the improvisation carried out by the dancers. Some believe that its origins trace back to competitive dance circles performed by individuals playing cajóns. Despite its African origins, people of all different backgrounds participate in the dance that many regards as one of the greatest representations of Peruvian culture.

It is currently performed, in its most traditional form, in San Luis de Cañete and El Carmen District, Chincha (Chincha).

History

There are theories that describe the Festejo as a dance that began in Lima in the mid-17th century, but they do not provide evidence to support these hypotheses. No musical example has yet been established to show that this musical form existed before 1800. However, some Festejos dating from the 19th century have been identified. Since the middle of the 20th century, old Festejos have been collected from the areas of Lima, Aucallama, Cañete and Chincha.

According to musicologist William Tompkins, by the early 1900s the original choreography was almost completely lost. It is from 1949, that a standard choreography for the "Festejo" begins to be generated in the "Peruvian Folk Music and Dance School" (today the José María Arguedas National Higher School of Folklore).

It is from 1960 that this dance becomes the most widespread musical genre among Afro-Peruvian artists. In large part due to the popularity of the musical works by José Durand, Victoria Santa Cruz and Nicomedes Santa Cruz.

In 1971, the "Black Art Festival" of Cañete began, which for the first time included a contest where the best dancer is elected "Miss Festejo". Between 1975 and 1977, a composition contest for Festejo and similar genres was included.

It is in this decade that a new style of Festejo is popularized for women that some musicians call "valentina style", for which they dress in colorful skirts and bras.

Globalization 
Due to the advent of globalization, many Afro-Peruvian music genres (especially Festejo) have been experiencing influences from other cultures and genres of music. Afro-Peruvian music was performed only in Afro-Peruvian communities to help create and maintain Afro-Peruvian identity and strengthen social bonds. However, globalization has brought those communities closer to the outside world that Afro-Peruvians started to market their songs to non Afro-Peruvian audiences. Therefore, the music genres, including Festejo, are adapting to the changing environment. Because of this change, the purpose of Festejo changed and many musicians are trying to use it as a way for economic prosperity rather than its traditional role in those communities.

Music 

The base of every festejo is rhythm, achieved through a series of melodies with the Peruvian cajón, quijada de burro, cajita, conga and bongo.

References

Further reading

Peruvian music
Peruvian dances
Peruvian culture